Republican City is a village, despite its name, in Harlan County, Nebraska, United States. The population was 150 at the 2010 census. The town is near the Harlan County Reservoir. At its peak in the 1950s the population was about 4 times larger than it is today.

History
Republican City was founded in 1871. It is named after the Republican River.

Geography
Republican City is located at  (40.097708, -99.221301).

Climate

Demographics

2010 census
At the 2010 census there were 150 people, 76 households, and 47 families in the village. The racial makeup of the village was 100.0% White. Hispanic or Latino of any race were 1.3%.

Of the 76 households 13.2% had children under the age of 18 living with them, 56.6% were married couples living together, 5.3% had a female householder with no husband present, and 38.2% were non-families. 34.2% of households were one person and 15.8% were one person aged 65 or older. The average household size was 1.97 and the average family size was 2.51.

The median age in the village was 59.8 years. 14% of residents were under the age of 18; 3.4% were between the ages of 18 and 24; 11.3% were from 25 to 44; 32.7% were from 45 to 64; and 38.7% were 65 or older. The gender makeup of the village was 52.7% male and 47.3% female.

2000 census
At the 2000 census there were 209 people, 107 households, and 69 families in the village. The population density was 633.8 people per square mile (244.5/km). There were 218 housing units at an average density of 661.1 per square mile (255.1/km).  The racial makeup of the village was 99.52% White, and 0.48% from two or more races. Hispanic or Latino of any race were 0.96%.

Of the 107 households 15.0% had children under the age of 18 living with them, 57.9% were married couples living together, 4.7% had a female householder with no husband present, and 35.5% were non-families. 33.6% of households were one person and 20.6% were one person aged 65 or older. The average household size was 1.95 and the average family size was 2.43.

The age distribution was 12.9% under the age of 18, 5.7% from 18 to 24, 11.0% from 25 to 44, 34.0% from 45 to 64, and 36.4% 65 or older. The median age was 60 years. For every 100 females, there were 101.0 males. For every 100 females age 18 and over, there were 100.0 males.

The median household income was $26,250, and the median family income  was $32,500. Males had a median income of $27,500 versus $17,917 for females. The per capita income for the village was $14,863. About 6.9% of families and 8.5% of the population were below the poverty line, including 10.5% of those under the age of eighteen and 12.2% of those sixty five or over.

References

Villages in Harlan County, Nebraska
Villages in Nebraska